John Tsatsimas  is the current Chief Executive Officer of Western Sydney Wanderers.

Career
In 2005, Tsatsimas joined Newcastle Jets as the club's legal councilor, before spending four seasons as chief executive officer. After helping the transition in ownership from Con Constantine to Nathan Tinkler and the Hunter Sports Group in September 2010, Tsatsimas resigned to spend more time with his family.

In June 2012, Tsatsimas was appointed general manager at Western Sydney Wanderers. Following the sale of Western Sydney Wanderers, the new owners announced Tsatsimas as the club's first CEO on 4 June 2014.

References

Living people
Year of birth missing (living people)